The sedia gestatoria (literally 'chair for carrying') or gestatorial chair is a ceremonial throne on which popes were carried on shoulders until 1978, which was later replaced outdoors in part with the popemobile. It consists of a richly adorned, silk-covered armchair, fastened on a suppedaneum, on each side of which are two gilded rings; through these rings pass the long rods with which twelve footmen (palafrenieri), in red uniforms, carry the throne on their shoulders. On prior occasions, as in the case of Pope Stephen III, popes were carried on the shoulders of men.
 
The sedia gestatoria is an elaborate variation on the sedan chair. Two large fans (flabella) made of white ostrich feathers—a relic of the ancient liturgical use of the flabellum, mentioned in the Constitutiones Apostolicae—were carried at either side of the sedia gestatoria.

History

The ceremonial throne was mainly used to carry popes to and from papal ceremonies in the Basilica of St. John Lateran and St. Peter's Basilica. The sedia was used as part of papal ceremony for nearly a millennium. Its origins are sometimes thought to date back to the Byzantine Empire where Byzantine emperors were carried along in a similar manner, but many sources indicate the use of the sedia is of a much earlier date, probably being derived from rituals accompanying the leadership of the ancient Roman Empire.

It was used in the solemn ceremonies of the coronation of a new pope until the enthronement ceremony was abandoned altogether. It also was used for solemn entries of the pope to St. Peter's or to public consistories. In the first case, three bundles of tow were burnt before the newly elected pontiff, who sits on the sedia gestatoria, while a master of ceremonies says: "Pater Sancte, sic transit gloria mundi" (Holy Father, so passes the glory of the world). The custom of carrying the newly elected pope, and formerly in some countries, a newly elected bishop to his church, can be traced back centuries and is comparable with the Roman use of the sella curulis, on which newly elected consuls were carried through the city.

Magnus Felix Ennodius, Bishop of Pavia, records in his "Apologia pro Synodo", Gestatoriam sellam apostolicae confessionis, alluding to the Cathedra S. Petri, still preserved in the choir of St. Peter's at Rome. This is a portable wooden armchair, inlaid with ivory, with two iron rings on each side.
 

Besides the use of the sedia gestatoria at the coronation of the pope (which seems to date from the beginning of the sixteenth century) it served in the past on different other occasions, for instance when the pope received the yearly tribute of the Kingdom of Naples and of the other fiefs, and also, at least since the fifteenth century, when he carried the Blessed Sacrament publicly, in which case the sedia gestatoria took a different form, a table being fixed in front of the throne. Pius X made use of this on the occasion of the Eucharistic Congress at Rome in 1905.

An antique portable throne can also be found in display at the Lisbon Cathedral museum along with a pair of flabella. It is thought the privilege of the portable throne was granted by the popes to the cardinal patriarchs of that city due to the financial support provided them by King John V of Portugal.

In the 1800s, Prince Alessandro Torlonia spent his Thursdays in bringing out a sedia gestatoria from Pope Leo XIII to carry the Santo Bambino of Aracoeli to the sick believers who were unable to travel to the Basilica of Santa Maria in Aracoeli.

Discontinuance 
Pope John Paul I initially declined to use the ceremonial throne carried on shoulders, along with several other symbols of papal authority, but was eventually convinced that it was necessary to make him visible to the crowds in Saint Peter's Square. He was the last pope to use the portable throne. Pope John Paul II discontinued the use of a throne carried on shoulders in 1978. Neither of his successors, Pope Benedict XVI and Pope Francis, has revived it. The sedia gestatoria has been replaced outdoors by the motorized "popemobile", which is often heavily protected and even armoured.

Notes

References
 

History of the papacy
Thrones
Italian words and phrases
Human-powered transport
Individual pieces of furniture